Richard Laurence Zusi (born 27 January 1930, in Winchester, Massachusetts) is an American ornithologist, known as a world-class expert on hummingbird anatomy and the functional anatomy of birds, in particular "avian jaw mechanics and the evolution of structural complexes."

Education and career
Zusi grew up in Toronto. He graduated in 1951 with a bachelor's degree from Northwestern University. In the zoology department of the University of Michigan he graduated with an M.S. in 1953 and a Ph.D. in 1959. From 1958 to 1963 he taught at the University of Maine. In 1963 he was hired by Philip Strong Humphrey (1926–2009) for the Division of Birds of the National Museum of Natural History in Washington, D.C.

Zusi was chiefly responsible for the modernization of the Smithsonian Institution's avian skeleton collection (over 30,000 specimens) and avian fluid-preserved collection (over 10,000 specimens). (The fluid used is commonly ethanol or isopropyl alcohol.)

Zusi has collected avian specimens not only in the United States and Canada, but also in South America (Brazil, Ecuador, Venezuela), the Caribbean (Dominica), and Iceland. He was the principal curator of the Roger Tory Peterson Exhibition, which was displayed from April to September in 1984. He retired in 1994 with the title "curator emeritus".

He was elected a fellow of the American Ornithologists' Union (AOU) in 1971.

Selected publications
 
 
 
 
 
 
 
 
 
  (over 600 citations)

Eponyms
 Heliangelus zusii Graves, 1993

References

External links
  (photograph)

American ornithologists
American curators
Northwestern University alumni
University of Michigan alumni
Smithsonian Institution people
1930 births
Living people